Constantin I. Iliescu was a Romanian politician.

From March to October 1863, Iliescu served as Finance Minister under Nicolae Crețulescu. From November 1865 to March 1866, he was the second mayor of Bucharest.

Notes

19th-century Romanian politicians
Romanian Ministers of Finance
Mayors of Bucharest